A Marine Conservation Zone (MCZ) is a type of marine nature reserve in UK waters. They were established under the Marine and Coastal Access Act (2009) and are areas designated with the aim to protect nationally important, rare or threatened habitats and species. Approximately 20% of UK waters now have some protection although some conservation, fisherman and wildlife groups are concerned that there are no management plans for each zone.

Following Brexit, legislation was introduced into Parliament in January 2020 which would give new powers to the Marine Management Organisation in English waters.

No Take Zones

MCZs generally do not provide "no-take" protection banning fishing. However,
Lundy Island MCZ includes a preexisting "no-take zone", which was established in 2003. 
Two more no-take zones were established in UK waters by 2010 (bringing the total area protected to five square kilometres):, and an additional one in 2016 
 Lamlash Bay (2008), subsequently included within the South Arran Marine Protection Area.
 Flamborough Head (2010). This no-take zone is part of a marine SAC rather than a MCZ.
 Medway Nursery Area (2016).  This 12.1 square kilometre no-take zone is part of the Medway Estuary MCZ.  

There has been criticism of the MCZs for not providing "no-take" protection for a higher proportion of UK waters; for example, the environmentalist George Monbiot has raised the issue in his column in The Guardian.

England 
On 21 November 2013 the first twenty-seven Marine Conservation Zones were designated, followed by a further twenty-three on 17 January 2016.

2013 Marine Conservation Zones
 Aln Estuary
 Beachy Head West
 Blackwater, Crouch, Roach and Colne Estuaries
 The Canyons
 Chesil Beach and Stennis Ledges
 Cumbria Coast
 East of Haig Fras
 Folkestone Pomerania
 Fylde
 Isles of Scilly
 Kingmere
 Lundy
 The Manacles
 Medway Estuary
 North East of Farnes Deep
 Padstow Bay and Surrounds
 Pagham Harbour
 Poole Rocks
 Skerries Bank and Surrounds
 South Dorset
 South-West Deeps (West)
 Swallow Sand
 Tamar Estuary
 Thanet Coast
 Torbay
 Upper Fowey and Pont Pill
 Whitsand and Looe Bay

2016 Marine Conservation Zones
 Allonby Bay
 Bideford to Foreland Bay
 Coquet to St Mary's
 Cromer Shoal Chalk Beds
 Dover to Deal
 Dover to Folkestone
 Farnes East
 Fulmar
 Greater Haig Fras
 Hartland Point to Tintagel
 Holderness Inshore
 North-west of Jones Bank
 Land's End
 Mount's Bay
 The Needles
 Newquay and The Gannel
 Offshore Brighton
 Offshore Overfalls (south-east of the Isle of Wight)
 Runswick Bay
 Swale Estuary
 Utopia (south-west of Selsey Bill)
 Western Channel
 West of Walney co-location zone

Northern Ireland
Following the passing of the Marine Act (Northern Ireland) 2013 only Strangford Lough was designated as a Marine Conservation Zone. In 2015 consultations for a further four proposed MCZs were announced.
The consultations ended in March 2016 and the four MCZs were designated in December 2016.

Proposed Marine Conservation Zones
 Carlingford
 Outer Belfast Lough
 Rathlin
 Waterfoot

Scotland
In the summer of 2014 the Cabinet Secretary for Rural Affairs, Food and the Environment announced thirty new Marine Protected Areas. Along with thirty Special Areas of Conservation (SAC), forty-seven Special Protection Areas (SPA) and sixty-one Sites of Special Scientific Interest (SSSI), 20% of Scottish waters have differing levels of protection.

Nature Conservation Marine Protected Areas

There are seventeen protected areas within Scotland's territorial waters (i.e. within )
 Clyde Sea Sill
 East Caithness Cliffs
 Fetlar to Haroldswick
 Loch Creran
 Loch Sunart
 Loch Sunart to the Sound of Jura
 Loch Sween
 Lochs Duich, Long and Alsh
 Monarch Isles
 Mousa to Boddam
 Noss Head
 Papa Westray
 Small Isles
 South Arran
 Upper Loch Fyne and Loch Goil
 Wester Ross
 Wyre and Rousay Sounds

A further thirteen protected areas are outside Scottish territorial waters
 Central Fladen (CFL)
 East of Gannet and Montrose Fields (EGM)
 Faroe-Shetland Sponge Belt (FSS)
 Firth of Forth Banks Complex (FOF)
 Geikie Slide and Hebridean Slope (GSH)
 Hatton-Rockall Basin (HRB)
 North-east Faroe-Shetland Channel (NEF)
 North-west Orkney (NWO)
 Norwegian Boundary Sediment Plain (NSP)
 Rosemary Bank Seamount (RBS)
 Barra Fan and Hebrides Terrace Seamount (BHT)
 Turbot Bank (TBB)
 West Shetland Shelf (WSS)

Wales
Skomer Marine Conservation Zone (around the island of Skomer) is the only site in Wales designated as a Marine Conservation Zone. There are 128 marine protected areas in Welsh seas and Natural Resources Wales (Cyfoeth Naturiol Cymru) is consulting with the Welsh Government and the Joint Nature Conservation Committee (JNCC) to consider if anymore areas need protecting.

References

External links
 Lundy Marine Conservation Zone Official Site

Fishing in the United Kingdom
Marine reserves of the United Kingdom
Lists of protected areas of the United Kingdom